This is a list of the works of fiction which have won the Spur Award for Best Western Novel:

 1953 - Novel: "Lawman" by Wayne D. Overholser using the pseudonym Lee Leighton
 1954 - Novel: "The Violent Land" by Wayne D. Overholser (2)
 1955 - Novel: "Somewhere They Die" by L.P. Holmes
 1956 - Novel: "High Gun" by Leslie Ernenwein
 1957 - Novel: "Buffalo Wagons" by Elmer Kelton
 1958 - Novel: "Short Cut to Red River" by Noel Loomis
 1959 - Novel: "Long Run" by Nelson C. Nye
 1960 - Novel: "The Nameless Breed by Will C. Brown
 1961 - Novel: "The Honyocker by Giles A. Lutz
 1962 - Novel: "Comanche Captives" by Fred Grove
 1963 - Novel: "Follow the Free Wind" by Leigh Brackett
 1964 - Novel: "The Trail to Ogallala'' by Benjamin Capps
 1965 - Novel: "Sam Chance" by Benjamin Capps (2)
 1966 - Novel: "My Brother John" by Herbert R. Purdum
 1967 - Novel: "The Valdez Horses" by Lee Hoffman
 1968 - Novel: "Down the Long Hills" by Louis L'Amour
 1969 - Novel: "Tragg's Choice" by Clifton Adams
 1970 - Novel: "The Last Days of Wolf Garnett" by Clifton Adams (2)
 1971 - Novel: "The Day the Cowboys Quit" by Elmer Kelton (2)
 1972 - Novel: "A Killing in Kiowa" by Lewis B. Patten
 1973 - Novel: "The Time It Never Rained" by Elmer Kelton (3)
 1974 - Novel: "A Hanging in Sweetwater" by Stephen Overholser (son of Wayne D. Overholser)
 1975 - Novel: "The Shootist" by Glendon Swarthout
 1976 - Novel (tie): "The Spirit Horses" by Lou Cameron and "The Court Martial of George Armstrong Custer" by Douglas C. Jones
 1977 - Novel: "The Great Horse Race" by Fred Grove (2)
 1978 - Novel: "Riders To Cibola" by Norman Zollinger
 1979 - Novel: "The Holdouts" by William Decker
 1980 - Novel: "The Valiant Women" by Jeanne Williams
 1981 - Novel (tie): "Eye of The Hawk" by Elmer Kelton (4) and "Horizon" by Lee Head
 1982 - Novel: "Match Race" by Fred Grove (3)
 1983 - Novel: "Leaving Kansas" by Frank Roderus
 1984 - Novel: no award
 1985 - Western Novel: "Lonesome Dove" by Larry McMurtry
 1986 - Western Novel: "The Blind Corral" by Ralph Robert Beer
 1987 - Western Novel: "Skinwalkers" by Tony Hillerman
 1988 - Western Novel: "Mattie" by Judy Alter
 1989 - Western Novel: "Fool's Coach" by Richard S. Wheeler
 1990 - Western Novel: "Sanctuary" by Gary Svee
 1991 - Western Novel: "Journal of the Gun Years" by Richard Matheson
 1992 - Western Novel: "Nickajack" by Robert J. Conley
 1993 - Western Novel: "Friends" by Charles Hackenberry
 1994 - Western Novel: "St. Agnes' Stand" by Tom Eidson
 1995 - Western Novel: "The Dark Island" by Robert J. Conley (2)
 1996 - Western Novel: "Blood of Texas" by Preston Lewis (writing as Will Camp)
 1997: W.W.A. changed the time-frame from 'year published' to 'year award presented'
 1998 - Western Novel: "The Kiowa Verdict" by Cynthia Haseloff
 1999 - Western Novel: "Journey of the Dead" by Loren D. Estleman
 2000 - Western Novel: "Masterson" by Richard S. Wheeler (2)
 2000 - Western Novel: "Summer of Pearls" by Mike Blakely 
 2001 - Western Novel: "The Gates of the Alamo" by Stephen Harrigan
 2002 - Western Novel: "The Way of The Coyote" by Elmer Kelton (5)
 2003 - Western Novel: "The Chili Queen" by Sandra Dallas
 2004 - Western Novel: "I Should Be Extremely Happy In Your Company" By Brian Hall
 2005 - Western Novel: "Buy The Chief A Cadillac" by Rick Steber
 2006 - Western Novel (tie): "Camp Ford: A Western Story" by Johnny D. Boggs and "The Undertaker's Wife" by Loren D. Estleman (2)
 2007 - Best Western Short Novel: "The Shape Shifter" by Tony Hillerman (2)
 2008 - Best Western Short Novel: "Tallgrass" By Sandra Dallas (2)
 2009 - Best Western Short Novel: "Another Man's Moccasins by Craig Johnson
 2010 - Best Western Short Novel: "Far Bright Star" by Robert Olmstead
 2011 - Best Western Short Novel: "Snowbound" by Richard S. Wheeler (3)
 2012 - Best Western Short Novel: "Legacy of a Lawman" by Johnny D. Boggs
 2013 - Best Western Short Novel: "Tucker's Reckoning" by Matthew Mayo
 2019 - Best Western Contemporary Novel: "The Flicker of Old Dreams" by Susan Henderson 

 10 authors have won the award on more than one occasion: Elmer Kelton (5): 1957, 1971, 1973, 1981, 2002; (3) each for: Fred Grove 1962, 1977, 1982; Richard S. Wheeler 1989, 2000, 2011; (2) each for: Clifton Adams 1969, 1970; Benjamin Capps 1964, 1965; Robert J. Conley 1992, 1995; Sandra Dallas 2003, 2008; Loren D. Estleman 1999, 2006; Tony Hillerman 1987, 2007; Wayne D. Overholser 1953, 1954;

American literary awards